The 2004 James Madison Dukes football team represented James Madison University in the 2004 NCAA Division I-AA football season, and completed the 32nd season of Dukes football. They were led by head coach Mickey Matthews and played their home games at Bridgeforth Stadium in Harrisonburg, Virginia. The 2004 team came off of a 6–6 record the previous season.  JMU finished the season 13–2 with a record of 7–1 in Atlantic 10 Conference play en route to the program's first NCAA Division I-AA national championship.

Schedule

References

James Madison
James Madison Dukes football seasons
NCAA Division I Football Champions
Atlantic 10 Conference football champion seasons
James Madison Dukes footbal